Tooker is a surname. Notable people with the surname include:

Gabriel Mead Tooker (1839–1905), American lawyer and clubman 
Gary L. Tooker, American businessman
George Tooker (1920–2011), American painter
Giles Tooker (c. 1565–1623), English lawyer and politician
Rhiannon Tooker (born 1990), Australian volleyball player
William Tooker (1557 or 1558–1621), English churchman and theological writer
William H. Tooker (1869–1936), American actor